Thomas Henry Brolly (1 June 1912 – June 1986) was a Northern Irish international footballer who played as a half-back. He spent the majority of his career at Millwall, making a total of 263 appearances and scoring 11 goals in all competitions. He spent two spells with Millwall, fighting in World War II in between. Brolly won the Football League Third Division South championship with Millwall in 1938, and reached the FA Cup semi-final in the same season. . He was capped four times for Northern Ireland, playing in two games against Wales in 1937 and 1938 and against England and Wales in 1939. Later in his career he was a trainer at Crystal Palace, Chelmsford City, and at Ipswich Town with Bobby Robson. Brolly was nicknamed "The Professor" while coaching at the Robert Browning Institute in Walworth.

References

Bibliography

External links
Northern Ireland's football greats - Tom Brolly
Millwall FC - In the beginning
 
 

1912 births
1986 deaths
Association footballers from Northern Ireland
Northern Ireland international footballers
Crusaders F.C. players
Glenavon F.C. players
Sheffield Wednesday F.C. players
Millwall F.C. players
Pre-1950 IFA international footballers
British military personnel of World War II
Association football midfielders